Pedro Gerardo María Beltrán Espantoso (17 February 1897 – 16 February 1979), was a Peruvian journalist, economist and politician. From 1959 to 1961, he was the Prime Minister and Minister of Finance under Manuel Prado Ugarteche.

Beltrán was the Peruvian Ambassador to the United States from 1944 to 1945. He became president of the Central Reserve Bank in 1948 and served until 1950.

References

Prime Ministers of Peru
Peruvian Ministers of Economy and Finance
Presidents of the Central Reserve Bank of Peru
People from Lima
1897 births
1979 deaths
National University of San Marcos alumni
Alumni of the London School of Economics